Nguyễn Ngọc Bình (born 17 September 1959) is a Vietnamese computer scientist. He is the director of the Francophone Institute for Informatics, Vietnam National University.

Chronology 
June 1981 – graduated from Kishinev University (USSR) with B.S. in Applied Mathematics.
March 1995	– received M.E. in Information and Computer Sciences from Toyohashi University of Technology (Japan)
March 1998 – received Ph.D. in Information and Computer Sciences from School of Engineering Science, Osaka University (Japan)
April 1998 – assistant professor at School of Knowledge Science, Japan Advanced Institute of Science and Technology
August 2000 – head of Department of Software Engineering, Faculty of Information Technology, Hanoi University of Technology (Vietnam)
May 2009 – was appointed the president of University of Engineering and Technology, VNU for the 2009-2014 period.
September 2014 - became the director of the Francophone Institute for Informatics, Vietnam National University, Hanoi.

Awards 
Winner of the IEICE Award for Excellent Research Results (from Tokai branch, Japan, 1995).
Honorary Doctorate from Toyohashi University of Technology.

References 

Osaka University alumni
1959 births
Living people
Toyohashi University of Technology alumni